The 1918 Georgia Tech Golden Tornado football team represented the Georgia Institute of Technology during the 1918 Southern Intercollegiate Athletic Association football season. The Tornado was coached by John Heisman in his 15th year as head coach, compiling a record of 6–1 (3–0 SIAA) and outscoring opponents 466 to 32. Georgia Tech played its home games at Grant Field.

Tech eclipsed 100 points three different times. Its only road game was its only loss to national champion Pittsburgh at Forbes Field. Pittsburgh was the only team to score on Tech during the 1918 season. The defeat ended Georgia Tech's 33-game winning streak.

Center Bum Day was recognized as a consensus first-team All-American. He was a first-team selection by Walter Camp; the first Southerner to be chosen for Camp's  All-America first team. Bill Fincher and Joe Guyon also made consensus All-America. Fincher and Buck Flowers made Camp's second-team.

Before the season

Because of America's entry into World War I in April 1917 and the ongoing war effort, several SIAA schools did not field football teams in 1918. Coming off the South's first national championship in 1917, Tech lost several players to the war effort and was heavily reliant on freshmen.

With captain-elect Everett Strupper lost to the war effort, tackle and placekicker Bill Fincher was left as captain. Fincher had a glass eye which he would covertly pull out after feigning an injury, turn to his opponents and say: "So that's how you want to play!"

Coach John Heisman used the pre-snap movement of his "jump shift" offense. Former end and Notre Dame alumnus Fay Wood assisted Heisman as line coach.

Buck Flowers was in his first year on the team. He was a small back who had transferred from Davidson, where last year he starred in the game against Tech. Flowers had grown to weigh 150 pounds and was a backup until Heisman discovered his ability as an open-field runner on punt returns. "Heisman's eyes bulged. And bulged again. On the first punt, Buck ran through the entire first team. Same thing again ... and again. Heisman had uncovered one of the greatest broken-field runners."

Schedule

Season summary

Clemson

Sources:

The season opened with a 28–0 defeat of Clemson.  During the game, Red Barron hurdled tacklers for a 40-yard gain. The last score came on a 55-yard run by Joe Guyon. Other scores came from Pug Allen and Wally Smith. Former captain Everett Strupper cheered from the sidelines.

The starting lineup was: Fincher (left end), Doyal (left tackle), Nesbit (left guard), Davis (center), Dowling (right guard), Vandegrift (right tackle), Staton (right end), Barron (quarterback), Ferst (left halfback), Guyon (right halfback), and Allen (fullback).

Furman

Sources:

Buck Flowers starred in the 118–0 victory over Furman. Joe Guyon played in the line and did well. Tech made 34 first downs. For one score, in the fourth quarter, Flowers hit Red Barron on a 72-yard touchdown pass that went 42 yards in the air.

The scoring breakdown: Barron got 4 touchdowns, Allen 3, Adams 2, Ferst 2, Guyon, Fincher, Flowers, Smith, Cobb, and Doyal one each. Fincher made 14 straight extra points. Flowers made the other two.

The starting lineup was: Fincher (left end), Doyal (left tackle), Rogers (left guard), Davis (center), Huffines (right guard), Guyon (right tackle), Staton (right end), Barron (quarterback), Flowers (left halfback), Ferst (right halfback), and Allen (fullback).

Georgia Eleventh Cavalry
Tech beat the Georgia Eleventh Cavalry, 123–0. The game was called after the start of the third quarter. The scoring breakdown: Flowers  got 5 touchdowns, Barron 4, Ferst, Allen, and Staton 2 each, Smith, Fincher, and Cobb one each.

Camp Gordon
Georgia Tech beat Camp Gordon 28–0. Frank Ferst and Red Barron each scored two touchdowns. "Barron had the game of his life" said the yearbook.

The game was nip and tuck until Everett Strupper, former Tech star playing for Gordon, fumbled, and Ferst recovered, racing 30 yards for a touchdown. In the third quarter, Red Barron had a 28-yard touchdown.

NC State

Sources:

Two days before the Armistice, Tech beat 1918 NC State Aggies football team 128–0. State's only highlight came in the third quarter, when John Ripple recovered a teammate's fumble and returned the ball 75 yards for a touchdown. However, it was called back due to an offsides penalty. Walter Camp attended the game. Ripple became the first football player from North Carolina ever to make an All-America team when he was selected second-team All-American by Camp. Five minutes into the fourth quarter, the game was called. The scoring breakdown: Barron and Ferst got 4 touchdowns each, Smith 3, Allen 3, Staton 2, Cobb 2, and Adams 1.

The starting lineup was: Fincher (left end), Doyal (left tackle), Nesbit (left guard), Day (center), Rogers (right guard), Webb (right tackle), Staton (right end), Barron (quarterback), Ferst (left halfback), Adams (right halfback), and Allen (fullback).

Pittsburgh

Sources:

After declining the challenge the previous year, Pop Warner's Pittsburgh team was set to play Georgia Tech. In a high-profile game played as a War Charities benefit Pitt dismantled Georgia Tech 32–0, ending Tech's 33-game streak without a loss. Pittsburgh was the 1918 national champion.

Warner historian Francis Powers wrote: 
At Forbes Field, the dressing rooms of the two teams were separated only by a thin wall. As the Panthers were sitting around, awaiting Warner's pre-game talk, Heisman began to orate in the adjoining room. In his charge to the Tech squad, Heisman became flowery and fiery. He brought the heroes of ancient Greece and the soldier dead in his armor among the ruins of Pompeii. It was terrific and the Panthers sat, spellbound. When Heisman had finished, Warner chortled and quietly said to his players: 'Okay, boys. There's the speech. Now go out and knock them off.'                                                            

Tech's play was early hindered by fumbles. One source relates "Guyon and Flowers were very clever at intercepting forward passes, which in a measure made up for the fumbling in an early part of the game." Guyon also starred on defense.

Pitt's first score came on a pass from Tom Davies to Katy Easterday. The next score came soon after the start of the second quarter, when Davies returned a punt back 50 yards for a touchdown. A double pass got the next score. The fourth touchdown was a 6-yard touchdown by George McLaren. A 55-yard touchdown run by Davies was the final score.

Pitt lost its only game to the Cleveland Naval Reserves. On the Naval team was former Tech star Judy Harlan. Harlan stated: "I intercepted a pass and returned it to midfield in the fourth quarter. I felt I at least had evened up some of the losses we had at Tech."

The starting lineup was: Fincher (left end), Doyal (left tackle), Mathes (left guard), Day (center), Huffines (right guard), Webb (right tackle), Staton (right end), Barron (quarterback), Flowers (left halfback), Guyon (right halfback), and Allen (fullback).

Auburn

Sources:

Tech beat Auburn 41–0 on a muddy field. Substitute quarterback B. Adams returned a kickoff 80 yards for a touchdown. The other five touchdowns were achieved by plodding through the mud. The first was on a pass from Buck Flowers to Joe Guyon. Flowers ran in the second, and Guyon ran in the third. Wally Smith made one, and Red Barron the last.

The starting lineup: was Fincher (left end), Doyal (left tackle), Webb (left guard), Day (center), Mathes (right guard), Huffines (right tackle), Staton (right end), Barron (quarterback), Flowers (left halfback), Ferst (right halfback), and Guyon (fullback).

University of Pennsylvania
Georgia Tech had a scheduled game with the University of Pennsylvania in Philadelphia canceled when the Spanish flu swept through Philadelphia.

Postseason

Awards and honors

Center Bum Day was recognized as a consensus first-team All-American. He was a first-team selection by Walter Camp.  Day's selection by Camp as a first-team All-American was a historic first; he was the first Southerner to be chosen for Camp's annual All-America first team, which had been historically loaded with college players from Harvard, Yale, Princeton, and other Northeastern colleges. Captain Bill Fincher was also a consensus All-American, as well as Joe Guyon. Fincher and halfback Buck Flowers made Camp's second-team All-American.

Championships
Tech won its fourth straight SIAA title.

Personnel

Depth chart
The following chart provides a visual depiction of Tech's lineup during the 1918 season with games started at the position reflected in parenthesis. The chart mimics the offense after the jump shift has taken place.

Varsity letterwinners

Line

Backfield

Unlisted
L. M. Lamar

Scoring leaders
The following is an incomplete list of statistics and scores, largely dependent on newspaper summaries.

Notes

Endnotes

References
 
 
 

Georgia Tech
Georgia Tech Yellow Jackets football seasons
Georgia Tech Golden Tornado football